The men's road race at the 1976 UCI Road World Championships was the 43rd edition of the event. The race took place on Sunday 5 September 1976 in Ostuni, Italy. The race was won by Freddy Maertens of Belgium.

Final classification

References

Men's Road Race
UCI Road World Championships – Men's road race
1976 Super Prestige Pernod